The fifth series of Junior Bake Off began 4 November 2019, with 20 contestants competing to be crowned the series 5 winner. Comedian Harry Hill presents the show, with baker Liam Charles and professional cookery writer Prue Leith as the judges this year. The bakers were divided into two groups of 10, with five eliminated from each group over five days of competition. The remaining five bakers from each group were combined in the week-long finals, culminating in a "super-difficult showdown" episode that determines the winner. Fin won the 2019 series.

Contestants
 Top 10
 Quarter finalist
 Semi-finalist
 Finalist
 Winner

Results summary 

Heat 1

Heat 2

Finals

Colour key:

 Baker was one of the judges' least favourite bakers that day, but was not eliminated.
 Baker was one of the judges' favourite bakers that day, but was not the Star Baker.
 Baker got through to the next round.
 Baker was eliminated.
 Baker was the Star Baker.
 Baker was a series runner-up.
 Baker was the series winner.

Episodes

 Baker eliminated
 Star Baker
 Winner

Episode 1: Cake

No bakers were eliminated, leading to a double elimination the following day.

Episode 2: Biscuits

Episode 3: Bread

Episode 4: Dessert

Episode 5: Pastry

Episode 6: Cake

No bakers were eliminated, leading to a double elimination the following day.

Episode 7: Biscuits

Episode 8: Bread

Episode 9: Dessert

Episode 10: Pastry

Episode 11: Chocolate

Episode 12: International

Episode 13: Construction

Episode 14: Pâtisserie (Semi-final)

Episode 15: Final

Ratings

References

The Great British Bake Off
2019 British television seasons